ADAMTS (short for a disintegrin and metalloproteinase with thrombospondin motifs) is a family of multidomain extracellular protease enzymes. 19 members of this family have been identified in humans, the first of which, ADAMTS1, was described in 1997. Known functions of the ADAMTS proteases include processing of procollagens and von Willebrand factor as well as cleavage of aggrecan, versican, brevican and neurocan, making them key remodeling enzymes of the extracellular matrix. They have been demonstrated to have important roles in connective tissue organization, coagulation, inflammation, arthritis, angiogenesis and cell migration. Homologous subfamily of ADAMTSL (ADAMTS-like) proteins, which lack enzymatic activity, has also been described. Most cases of thrombotic thrombocytopenic purpura arise from autoantibody-mediated inhibition of ADAMTS13.

Like ADAMs, the name of the ADAMTS family refers to its disintegrin and metalloproteinase activity, and in the case of ADAMTS, the presence of a thrombospondin motif.

ADAMTS family members

ADAMTS1 (or METH-1), an antiangiogenic
ADAMTS2
ADAMTS3
ADAMTS4
ADAMTS5 (=ADAMTS11)
ADAMTS6
ADAMTS7
ADAMTS8 (or METH-2), an antiangiogenic
ADAMTS9
ADAMTS10
ADAMTS12
ADAMTS13
ADAMTS14
ADAMTS15
ADAMTS16
ADAMTS17
ADAMTS18
ADAMTS19
ADAMTS20

See also
 A disintegrin and metalloproteinase (ADAM) family
 ADAMTSL family (ADAMTS-like proteins)

References

 
EC 3.4.24
Protein families